Rubioideae is a subfamily of flowering plants in the family Rubiaceae and contains about 7600 species in 27 tribes.

Tribes 

 Anthospermeae Cham. & Schltdl. ex DC.
 Argostemmateae Bremek. ex Verdc.
 Clarkelleae Deb
 Colletoecemateae Rydin & B.Bremer
 Coussareeae Hook.f.
 Craterispermeae Verdc.
 Cyanoneuroneae Razafim. & B.Bremer
 Danaideae B.Bremer & Manen
 Dunnieae Rydin & B.Bremer
 Gaertnereae Bremek. ex S.P.Darwin
 Knoxieae Hook.f.
 Lasiantheae B.Bremer & Manen
 Mitchelleae Razafim. & B.Bremer & Manen
 Morindeae Miq.
 Ophiorrhizeae Bremek. ex Verdc.
 Paederieae DC.
 Palicoureeae Robbr. & Manen
 Perameae Bremek. ex S.P.Darwin
 Prismatomerideae Y.Z.Ruan
 Psychotrieae Cham. & Schltdl.
 Putorieae
 Rubieae Baill.
 Schizocoleeae Rydin & B.Bremer
 Schradereae Bremek.
 Spermacoceae Cham. & Schltdl. ex DC.
 Theligoneae Wunderlich ex S.P.Darwin
 Urophylleae Bremek. ex Verdc.

References 

 
Gentianales subfamilies